A list of French-produced films scheduled for release in 2015.

2015

Notes

External links
 French films of 2015 at the Internet Movie Database
 2015 in France
 2015 in French television
 List of 2015 box office number-one films in France

French
2015
Films